

The Farman HF.7 was a reconnaissance aircraft built in France shortly before the First World War.

Specifications

References

Bibliography

1910s French military reconnaissance aircraft
HF.07
Single-engined pusher aircraft
1910s French military trainer aircraft
Sesquiplanes
Aircraft first flown in 1912
Rotary-engined aircraft